Petrič may refer to:

 Borut Petrič, Slovenian swimmer
 Darjan Petrič, Slovenian swimmer
 Dušan Petrič, Slovenian painter and graphic designer 
 Ernest Petrič, Slovenian legal scholar and diplomat
 Joseph Petrič, Canadian musician of Slovenian descent
 Luka Petrič, Slovenian badminton player

Slovene-language surnames